Catharina Justander (Lempäälä, 1723 - Zeist, 5 October 1778) was a Finnish (Swedish) missionary. As a missionary, she played a leading role in spreading the Moravian Church in Stockholm (Sweden), Turku (Finland) and Zeist (The Netherlands), and was made an Acolyte.

References
 Suomen kansallisbiografia/Finlands nationalbiografi

1723 births
1778 deaths
18th-century Finnish people
18th-century religious leaders
Finnish Lutheran missionaries
Women Protestant religious leaders
18th-century Christian clergy
Lutheran missionaries in Europe
Protestant missionaries in Finland
Swedish Lutheran missionaries
Female Christian missionaries
Swedish people of the Moravian Church
18th-century Finnish women